Vault Records was a record label founded by Jack Lewerke and Ralph Keffel in Los Angeles in 1963.

Vault is known for contributing to the popularity of surf rock by releasing Surfbeat, the debut album of the Challengers. ATCO Records distributed the label's recordings until 1965, when the task was taken over by Autumn Records, an independent label in San Francisco. After Autumn folded in 1966, Vault was given the catalogue. As surf rock lost popularity, Vault reissued some of its more obscure releases and signed psychedelic rock musicians. By 1969, Vault had released two nationally charting singles, and Lewerke sold the company to National Tape Distributors of Milwaukee. In 1971, he repurchased the master tapes and reissued material on JAS Records.

Vault's jazz catalogue included albums by Hampton Hawes, Charlie Barnet, and Larry Bunker with Gary Burton.

References

American record labels
Record labels established in 1963
Pop record labels
Rock record labels
Rhythm and blues record labels